The Hours of Isabella Stuart, Duchess of Brittany (MS 62) is an illuminated Book of Hours produced at Angers either between 1417 and 1418 or before 1431 (there are two competing theories as to its commission), in the workshop of the Rohan Master, though there were contributions from other masters, including the Master of Giac and the Master of the Virgin.

The manuscript follows the Paris liturgy of the Hours and is written in Latin.  It measures 24.8 by 17.8 cm and has 234 folios. It is made from gold, ink and egg tempera.  It was acquired by Richard Fitzwilliam in 1808, who bequeathed it to the Fitzwilliam Museum of Cambridge upon his death in 1816.

It was produced for Yolande of Aragon (1380–1442), Duchess of Anjou, but is named after Isabella Stuart, who was one of its earliest owners and had her family coat of arms added to the book. Yolande was known for her intelligence and political acumen, and was a patron of the arts, commissioning c. 1400–1414 the building of the chapel of John the Baptist in the Château d'Angers. She at one time owned the "Belles Heures of Jean de France, Duc de Berry" book of hours, and made it available to the Rohan Master while he was working on this book, which was probably intended for her daughter, also named Yolande (1412–40), on the occasion of her marriage to Francis I, Duke of Brittany.

References

Sources
 Harthan, John. Book Of Hours. London: Random House, 1988.  
 Hourihane, Colum. The Grove Encyclopedia of Medieval Art and Architecture. Oxford: Oxford University Press, 2012. 

Isabella Stuart
Manuscripts of the Fitzwilliam Museum
15th-century illuminated manuscripts